Rubén Enri García (born 10 April 1998) is a Spanish footballer who plays as a forward for UE Cornellà, on loan from FC Andorra.

Club career
Born in Barcelona, Catalonia, Enri was a RCD Espanyol youth graduate. He made his senior debut with the reserves on 2 April 2017, coming on as a second-half substitute for Mickaël Latour in a 0–3 Segunda División B away loss against CD Alcoyano.

On 6 July 2017, Enri renewed his contract until 2020 and was immediately loaned to CF Badalona for a year. Roughly one year later he joined another reserve team, CF Reus Deportiu B of the Tercera División.

Enri made his professional debut with the main squad on 25 August 2018, replacing Álex Carbonell in a 0–0 home draw against Real Zaragoza in the Segunda División. He scored his first professional goal on 9 September, but in a 1–2 home loss against Albacete Balompié.

Enri continued to appear exclusively with the B-side after Reus' ejection from the Liga de Fútbol Profesional. On 9 July 2019, he signed for another reserve team, UD Almería B in the fourth division.

On 27 October 2019, Enri scored a hat-trick in a 3–2 away win against Vélez CF. On 24 November, he scored four times in a 6–0 home routing of Atlético Porcuna CF, taking his tally up to 18 goals in only 14 matches.

Enri made his first-team debut for the Rojiblancos on 22 December 2019, replacing injured Ante Ćorić late into a 2–3 home loss against SD Ponferradina. The following 5 May, amidst the COVID-19 pandemic, he renewed his contract with the club until 2024.

On 18 September 2020, Enri was loaned to FC Andorra in the third division, for the 2020–21 season. The following 12 July, he signed a permanent three-year deal with the club, and helped in the club's first-ever promotion to the second tier at the end of the season.

On 18 July 2022, Enri was loaned to Primera División RFEF side UE Cornellà, for one year.

References

External links

1998 births
Living people
Footballers from Barcelona
Spanish footballers
Association football forwards
Segunda División players
Primera Federación players
Segunda División B players
Tercera División players
CF Damm players
RCD Espanyol B footballers
CF Badalona players
CF Reus Deportiu B players
CF Reus Deportiu players
UD Almería B players
UD Almería players
FC Andorra players
UE Cornellà players
Spanish expatriate footballers
Expatriate footballers in Andorra
Spanish expatriate sportspeople in Andorra